House Slaves (Swedish: Hemslavinnor) is a 1933 Swedish comedy film directed by Ragnar Widestedt and starring Dagmar Ebbesen, Isa Quensel and Hasse Ekman. It is a remake of the 1923 film of the same title also starring Ebbesen. A separate Danish-language version Den ny husassistent was also produced.

Synopsis
Greta is recruited as a maid in the house of the middle class Rosenqvist family.

Cast
 Dagmar Ebbesen	Kristina
 Isa Quensel as 	Greta
 Valdemar Dalquist as 	Palle Rosenqvist
 Anna Widforss as 	Klara Rosenqvist
 Hasse Ekman as 	Kurt Rosenqvist
 Maj Törnblad as Inga
 Håkan Westergren as 	Einar Nilsson
 Olav Riégo as Bergman
 Signe Wirff as 	Mrs. Bergman
 Eric Abrahamsson as 	K.A. Jönsson
 Gösta Bodin as 	Vacuum cleaner salesman
 Rulle Bohman as 	Mr. Borg
 Ludde Juberg as 	Anton Björketopp

References

Bibliography 
 Freiburg, Jeanne Ellen. Regulatory Bodies: Gendered Visions of the State in German and Swedish Cinema. University of Minnesota, 1994.
 Qvist, Per Olov & Von Bagh, Peter . Guide to the Cinema of Sweden and Finland. Greenwood Publishing Group, 2000.

External links 
 

1933 films
Swedish comedy films
1933 comedy films
1930s Swedish-language films
Films directed by Ragnar Widestedt
Swedish films based on plays
Remakes of Swedish films
Swedish black-and-white films
Nordisk Film films
1930s Swedish films